Aloysius "Ally" McGowan (22 January 1930 – 5 July 2005) was a Scottish former footballer, who played as a defender.

Career
After playing for his village's youth team, McGowan was signed to Fauldhouse United. He played there for two years before being approached by the manager of Scottish Division Two side St Johnstone to play for the team.

Whilst at St Johnstone, McGowan would play for Scotland B.

In 1953, new St Johnstone manager Johnny Pattillo wanted to reduce the number of players in the squad, so let McGowan leave to Welsh club Wrexham on a free transfer.

Whilst there, he got over 400 league appearances for Wrexham, and has the 4th most appearances by any player for Wrexham.

McGowan retired in 1963 due to ongoing problems from an ankle injury at the age of 33, after a brief spell at Bethesda Athletic. After retirement, McGowan served as the Wrexham groundsman for between seven and eight years.

Personal life and death
McGowan was the brother of former Partick Thistle left-back Jimmy McGowan.

McGowan died on 5 July 2005 in Wrexham.

References

1930 births
2005 deaths
Association football defenders
Scottish footballers
English Football League players
Fauldhouse United F.C. players
St Johnstone F.C. players
Wrexham A.F.C. players
Bethesda Athletic F.C. players
Wrexham A.F.C. non-playing staff
Scottish Football League players
Scotland B international footballers
Footballers from Airdrie, North Lanarkshire
Scottish Junior Football Association players